To Syria, with Love is the third studio album by Syrian musician Omar Souleyman. It was released on 2 June 2017 under Mad Decent.

Background
In a press release, Souleyman described the album as a "personal ode to Syria" and focuses on his emotional connection with the country. Longtime collaborator, Shawah Al Ahmad, wrote most of the lyrics for the album.

Critical reception
To Syria, with Love was met with generally favorable reviews from critics. At Metacritic, which assigns a weighted average rating out of 100 to reviews from mainstream publications, this release received an average score of 70, based on 13 reviews

Accolades

Track listing

Charts

References

2017 albums
Mad Decent albums